, meaning sword, is a  mountain on the border of Miyoshi, Mima and Naka in Tokushima Prefecture, Japan. This mountain is one of the 100 Famous Japanese Mountains.

Outline
Mount Tsurugi is the second highest mountain on the island of Shikoku, and also the second highest mountain west of Mount Haku, which is on the border of Ishikawa and Gifu prefectures in central Japan.

Mount Tsurugi is an important object of worship in this region and one of the centers of Shugendō, a sect of mixture of Shinto and Buddhism. On the top of the mountain, there is a small shrine called ‘Tsurugi Jinja’.

The area around Mount Tsurugi is a major part of Tsurugi Quasi-National Park.

Climate
Mount Tsurugi has an altitude-affected humid continental climate (Köppen climate classification Dfb) with mild summers and cold winters.

Access
 The main trailhead, along with parking lots, shops and restaurants, is located at Minokoshi, at the intersection of national routes 438 and 439.  From Minokoshi, climbers may also ride a chairlift to a higher point on the trail.
 Trails link the summit of Mount Tsurugi to neighboring mountains.  Tsurugi can be reached from the east via Ichinomori, while an extensive network of trails to the west allows access from mountains such as Jirogyu, Miune, and Tengu-zuka.

See also

 List of Ultras of Japan
 Tsurugisan (train), a train service named after Mount Tsurugi in Tokushima

References

External links

 the Geographical Survey Institute in Japan
 Tsurugi Quasi-National Park
 ‘Ishizuchi Shinko Tsurugisan’
 "Tsurugi-san, Japan" on Peakbagger

Tsurugi
Miyoshi, Tokushima